The  superyacht Aquijo was launched at the Oceanco yard in Alblasserdam. United States based Tripp Design Naval Architects designed the exterior of Aquijo, with interior design by Dölker + Voges GmbH.

As of June 2018, she is the largest ketch in the world.

Aquijo is available as a charter yacht.

Design 
The hull is built out of steel while the superstructure is made out of aluminium with teak laid decks. The yacht is Lloyd's registered, issued by Cayman Islands. She has a sail area of 3,995m².

See also
 List of large sailing yachts
 List of yachts built by Oceanco
 Luxury yacht
 Oceanco
 Vitters

References

2015 ships
Sailing yachts
Ships built in the Netherlands